Syncolostemon is a genus of plants in the family Lamiaceae, first described in 1838. It is native primarily to South Africa, with some species in other parts of sub-Saharan Africa (including Madagascar), plus one species in India.

Species
 Syncolostemon albiflorus (N.E.Br.) D.F.Otieno - Transvaal, Eswatini
 Syncolostemon argenteus N.E.Br. - KwaZulu-Natal 
 Syncolostemon bolusii (N.E.Br.) D.F.Otieno - KwaZulu-Natal 
 Syncolostemon bracteosus (Benth.) D.F.Otieno - widespread across much of sub-Saharan Africa 
 Syncolostemon canescens (Gürke) D.F.Otieno - Angola, Botswana, Zimbabwe, Eswatini, South Africa
 Syncolostemon cinereum (Codd) D.F.Otieno & Retief - South Africa 
 Syncolostemon comosus (Wight ex Benth.) D.F.Otieno - southern India 
 Syncolostemon comptonii Codd - Eswatini
 Syncolostemon concinnus N.E.Br.  - Eswatini, South Africa
 Syncolostemon densiflorus Benth.  - South Africa 
 Syncolostemon elliottii (Baker) D.F.Otieno - Zimbabwe, Botswana, Transvaal 
 Syncolostemon eriocephalus Verd. - Northern Province of South Africa 
 Syncolostemon flabellifolius (S.Moore) A.J.Paton - Chimanimani Mountains of Mozambique + Zimbabwe 
 Syncolostemon floccosus (Launert) D.F.Otieno - Namibia 
 Syncolostemon foliosus (S.Moore) D.F.Otieno - Eswatini, South Africa
 Syncolostemon gerrardii (N.E.Br.) D.F.Otieno - South Africa 
 Syncolostemon incanus (Codd) D.F.Otieno - Northern Province of South Africa 
 Syncolostemon latidens (N.E.Br.) Codd - KwaZulu-Natal 
 Syncolostemon linearis (Benth.) D.F.Otieno - Zimbabwe 
 Syncolostemon macranthus (Gürke) Ashby - Drakensberg Mountains in South Africa 
 Syncolostemon macrophyllus Gürke - South Africa 
 Syncolostemon madagascariensis (A.J.Paton & Hedge) D.F.Otieno - Madagascar 
 Syncolostemon modestus (Codd) D.F.Otieno - Eswatini, South Africa
 Syncolostemon namapaensis D.F.Otieno - Mozambique, Tanzania 
 Syncolostemon obermeyerae (M.Ashby) D.F.Otieno - Northern Province of South Africa 
 Syncolostemon oritrephes (Wild) D.F.Otieno - Chimanimani Mountains of Mozambique + Zimbabwe 
 Syncolostemon ornatus (S.Moore) D.F.Otieno - Chimanimani Mountains of Zimbabwe 
 Syncolostemon parviflorus E.Mey. ex Benth. - Eswatini, South Africa
 Syncolostemon parvifolius (Codd) D.F.Otieno - Northern Province of South Africa 
 Syncolostemon persimilis (N.E.Br.) D.F.Otieno - Northern Province of South Africa 
 Syncolostemon petiolatus (Ashby) D.F.Otieno - Eswatini, South Africa, Mozambique
 Syncolostemon pretoriae (Gürke) D.F.Otieno - Eswatini, South Africa
 Syncolostemon punctatus (Codd) D.F.Otieno - Northern Province of South Africa 
 Syncolostemon ramosus (Codd) D.F.Otieno - KwaZulu-Natal 
 Syncolostemon ramulosus E.Mey. ex Benth. - KwaZulu-Natal, Cape Province 
 Syncolostemon rehmannii (Gürke) D.F.Otieno - Northern Province of South Africa 
 Syncolostemon rotundifolius E.Mey. ex Benth. - KwaZulu-Natal, Cape Province 
 Syncolostemon rugosifolius (M.Ashby) D.F.Otieno - Northern Province of South Africa 
 Syncolostemon stalmansii (A.J.Paton & K.Balkwill) D.F.Otieno - Mpumalanga, Eswatini
 Syncolostemon stenophyllus (Gürke) D.F.Otieno - KwaZulu-Natal, Cape Province 
 Syncolostemon subvelutinus (Gürke) D.F.Otieno - Northern Province of South Africa 
 Syncolostemon teucriifolius (Hochst.) D.F.Otieno - Mozambique, Zimbabwe, South Africa 
 Syncolostemon thorncroftii (N.E.Br.) D.F.Otieno - Northern Province of South Africa 
 Syncolostemon transvaalensis (Schltr.) D.F.Otieno - Northern Province of South Africa 
 Syncolostemon welwitschii (Rolfe) D.F.Otieno - Nigeria, Cameroon, Central African Republic, Zaire, Tanzania, Zambia, Angola

References

Lamiaceae
Lamiaceae genera